Bis(triphenylphosphine)platinum chloride is a metal phosphine complex with the formula PtCl2[P(C6H5)3]2. Cis- and trans isomers are known. The cis isomer is a white crystalline powder, while the trans isomer is yellow. Both isomers are square planar about the central platinum atom. The cis isomer is used primarily as a reagent for the synthesis of other platinum compounds.

Preparation
The cis isomer is the prepared by heating solutions of platinum(II) chlorides with triphenylphosphine.  For example, starting from potassium tetrachloroplatinate:
K2PtCl4 + 2 PPh3 → cis-Pt(PPh3)2Cl2  + 2 KCl

The trans isomer is the prepared by treating potassium trichloro(ethylene)platinate(II) (Zeise's salt) with triphenylphosphine:
KPt(C2H4)Cl3 + 2 PPh3 → trans-Pt(PPh3)2Cl2 + KCl + C2H4

With heating or in the presence of excess PPh3, the trans isomer converts to the cis complex. The latter complex is the thermodynamic product due to triphenylphosphine being a strong trans effect ligand.

In cis-bis(triphenylphosphine)platinum chloride, the average Pt-P has a bond distance of 2.261 Å and the average Pt-Cl has a bond distance of 2.346 Å. In trans-bis(triphenylphosphine)platinum chloride, the Pt-P distance is 2.316 Å and the Pt-Cl distance is 2.300 Å.

The complex also undergoes photoisomerization.

See also
 Bis(triphenylphosphine)palladium(II) chloride
 Bis(triphenylphosphine)nickel(II) chloride

References

Platinum(II) compounds
Homogeneous catalysis
Triphenylphosphine complexes
Chloro complexes
B